José Ángel Espinoza Aragón (2 October 1919 – 6 November 2015), also known as Ferrusquilla, was a Mexican singer-songwriter and film actor. He was the father of actress Angélica Aragón. There is a statue of him along Olas Altas Promenade in Mazatlán, Mexico. He also was a composer affiliated to the SACM (Society of Authors and Composers of Mexico).

Selected filmography

¡Ya tengo a mi hijo! (1946) – Gitano (uncredited)
A media luz (1947)
The Private Affairs of Bel Ami (1947) – Vendedor de paraguas (uncredited)
El casado casa quiere (1948) – José Conejo
Hijos de la mala vida (1949)
Midnight (1949) – Profesor Florentino Mendizábal
The Perez Family (1949) – Narrator
Carta Brava (1949) – Gilberto
Las puertas del presidio (1949) – Zeferino Martínez 'El Ciengramos'
La liga de las muchachas (1950) – Mario
Mariachis (1950)
Quinto patio (1950) – Javier
Pata de palo (1950) – Ferruco
La tienda de la esquina (1951) – Cristóbal
La hija de la otra (1951) – Picot
Retorno al quinto patio (1951) – Javier
Mátenme porque me muero (1951) – Narrator
Por el mismo camino (1953) – Fritas
The Strange Passenger (1953) – Lucas Soriano
Reportaje (1953) – Young doctor from Yucatán
The Rapture (1954) – Don Cándido
Madame X (1955) – Ruperto Sánchez (Sanchitos)
Amor de lejos (1955) – El enchufe
Fury in Paradise (1955)
The Littlest Outlaw (1955) – Señor Garcia
Massacre (1956) – Vincent
Comanche (1956) – Scalphunter (uncredited)
Bandido (1956) – Driver
Mi influyente mujer (1957)
Tres desgraciados con suerte (1958)
Aquí está Heraclio Bernal (1958) – Vicente Bernal
El rayo de Sinaloa (La venganza de Heraclio Bernal) (1958) – Vicente Bernal
Sierra Baron (1958) – Felipe
La rebelión de la sierra (1958) – Vicente Bernal
Qué noche aquella (1959)
Pa' qué me sirve la vida (1961)
Dos Alegres Gavilanes (1963) – Tito
Qué bonito es querer (1963)
El hombre de papel (1963) – Torcuato
El amor llegó a Jalisco (1963)
El norteño (1963)
Dos alegres gavilanes (1963) – Titote
Vuelve el Norteño (1964) – Chimino
Dos inocentes mujeriegos (1964)
Los hermanos Barragán (1964) – Figaro
Cuatro balazos (1964) – Borracho
La sombra del mano negra (1964)
La nueva Cenicienta (1964)
El niño y el muro (1965) – Hombre que escapa del muro
Las tapatías nunca pierden (1965) – Casio
El dengue del amor (1965)
Viva Maria! (1965) – The Dictator of San Miguel
El tragabalas (1966) – Viejo preso
Gigantes planetarios (1966) – Rey Taquito
El planeta de las mujeres invasoras (1966) – Taquito
Los jinetes de la bruja (En el viejo Guanajuato) (1966) – Don Manuelito
Rage (1966)
La guerrillera de Villa (1967)
The Bandits (1967)
El centauro Pancho Villa (1967) – Miguelito
Guns for San Sebastian (1968) – Luis
House of Evil (1968) – Dr. Emery Horvath
The Candy Man (1969) – The Vagabond
Faltas a la moral (1970) – Filarmonico
Two Mules for Sister Sara (1970) – French Officer
Chisum (1970) – Governor's Aide (uncredited)
El hermano Capulina (1970) – Carlos Gutiérrez
The Bridge in the Jungle (1970) – Garcia
El tunco Maclovio (1970) – The Gunfighter
Rio Lobo (1970) – (uncredited)
Big Jake (1971) – Hotel Clerk (uncredited)
Chico Ramos (1971)
Something Big (1971) – Emilio Estevez
Los Beverly de Peralvillo (1971) – El Padrino, abogado
The Doubt (1972) – Don Pío
Pobre, pero honrada (1973) – Chimino
El extraño caso de Rachel K (1973)
En busca de un muro (1974) – Dr. Atl
El desconocido (1974) – Sanchito
Mary, Mary, Bloody Mary (1975)
El padrino... es mi compadre (1975)
El alegre divorciado (1976) – Gonzalitos
Cuartelazo (1977) – Manuel Gutiérrez Zamora
Mariachi – Fiesta de sangre (1977) – Don Nico
Ratero (1979) – Profe
El Bronco (1982) – Manager
To Kill a Stranger (1984) – Gas attendant
Guantanamera (1995) – Justo
Sabor latino (1996) – Comisario René
Mambí (1998) – Parroquiano (final film role)

Selected songs
"Échame a mi la culpa"
"La ley del monte"
"El tiempo que te quede libre"
"Cariño nuevo"
"Silencio Corazón"
"Sufriendo a solas"

References

External links
 

1919 births
2015 deaths
Mexican male film actors
People from Sinaloa
Mexican songwriters
Male songwriters
Latin music songwriters
Male actors from Sinaloa